Vemuru railway station (station code:VMU) is an Indian Railways station, located in Vemuru of Guntur district in Andhra Pradesh. It is situated on Tenali–Repalle branch line and is administered by Guntur railway division of South Coast Railway zone. It is classified as an E-category station in the division.

History 

The station got access due to the opening of Guntur–Repalle broad-gauge section via Tenali in the year 1916, when it was under Madras and Southern Mahratta Railway.

Structure and amenities 
The station has roof top solar panels installed by the Indian railways, along with various railway stations and service buildings in the country, as a part of sourcing 500 MW solar energy.

See also 
 List of railway stations in India

References

External links

Railway stations on Tenali-Repalle line
Railway stations in Guntur district
Railway stations opened in 1916
Railway stations in Guntur railway division